A bostanji (also spelled bostandji or bostangi; from , literally "gardener") was a member of one of the types of imperial guards of the Ottoman Empire. The bostanji were mainly responsible for protecting the sultan's palace and its premises. They also guarded the seraglio and rowed the Sultan's barge. Their chief was called the Bostanji-bashi, and he had the rank of a pasha. The bostanji at one time numbered 3000, and were united with the janissaries, another Ottoman imperial guard corps, in military duty. In war time their strength was 12,000. By the beginning of the 20th century their number was about 600.

See also
 Topkapı Palace

References

External links
 "Image of a Bostanji-bashi." Digital Gallery. New York Public Library. 2009.

Ottoman titles
Turkish words and phrases
Royal guards
Military units and formations of the Ottoman Empire